Foul is a nautical term meaning to entangle or entwine, and more generally that something is wrong or difficult. The term dates back to usage with wind-driven sailing ships.

Foul anchor
It is usually applied to the state of an anchor, which has become hooked on some impediment on the seafloor, or has its cable wound round the stock or flukes. The term is generally utilized when speaking of items of historical value such as the US Navy chief petty officer emblem. The foul anchor is also the official seal of the Lord High Admiral of the United Kingdom. The position is currently vacant. The seal is flown on the ship carrying the monarch to sea. It is also flown during the launching of a warship of the Royal Navy. The fouled anchor is also depicted on the emblem of the U.S. Public Health Service. Ships would display a fouled anchor to indicate to officers on shore that sick persons were on board, prompting further investigation and possible quarantine.

Other usage
The term can be applied to many nautical situations:
Foul hawse — when a ship lying to two anchors gets the cables crossed.
Foul bottom — in reference to a seafloor that has poor qualities for securing an anchor, such as hard rocks, coral, wreckage, or other impedents that would make securing or unsecuring an anchor difficult or impossible. Also, in reference to the hull of ship that is so encrusted with weeds and marine growth as to impede her progress.
Foul wind — when a strong head wind prevents a sailing ship from keeping her desired course.
Foul deck — on an aircraft carrier, when the deck is occupied by aircraft, thus preventing other aircraft from landing.
Foul propeller (or foul prop) — a propeller which has become tangled with a rope/cable/line, or (generally on smaller propellers) weeds
Foul weather - any weather condition deemed hostile to sailors' vessel or comfort; encompasses heavy winds, rains, etc.

References

Nautical terminology